Matthew Salesses is a Korean American fiction writer and essayist and Assistant Professor of Creative Writing in the MFA/PhD program at Oklahoma State University.

Life 
Salesses was born in South Korea and adopted by white American parents at age 2. He grew up in Storrs, Conn. and attended the University of North Carolina, Chapel Hill, where he studied English and creative writing. After college he taught English abroad, first in Prague and then in South Korea. He earned a Ph.D. in Literature and Creative Writing from the University of Houston and an M.F.A. in Fiction from Emerson College. Salesses is currently an Assistant Professor of Writing at Columbia University.

Work 
Salesses is the author of the novel The Hundred-Year Flood (Little A, 2015). He is also the author of Disappear Doppelgänger Disappear: A Novel (Little A, 2020); Craft in the Real World (Catapult Books, 2021), an examination of American writing workshops and the incorporation of Eastern storytelling traditions and methodology; I'm Not Saying, I'm Just Saying (Civil Coping Mechanisms); Different Racisms: On Stereotypes, the Individual, and Asian American Masculinity (Thought Catalog Books); and The Last Repatriate (Nouvella).

In 2015 Buzzfeed named him one of 32 Essential Asian American Writers. His essays have been published in Best American Essays 2020, NPR Code Switch, The New York Times Motherlode, Glimmer Train, and VICE.com. He has received awards and fellowships from the Bread Loaf Writers’ Conference and Mid-American Review.

For years, he wrote about fiction craft and pedagogy for the Pleiades blog, where he was the Website Editor. He has taught at Tin House and Kundiman.

Books 

 The Last Repatriate (Nouvella, 2011)
 I'm Not Saying, I'm Just Saying (Civil Coping Mechanisms, 2013)
 The Hundred-Year Flood, (Little A, 2015).
 Different Racisms: On Stereotypes, the Individual, and Asian American Masculinity (Thought Catalog Books, 2017)
 Disappear Doppelgänger Disappear: A Novel (Little A, 2020)
 Craft in the Real World (Catapult Books, 2021)

References 

American people of Korean descent
American fiction writers
American essayists
Writers of books about writing fiction
Living people
21st-century American novelists
Year of birth missing (living people)